John S. Rodgers (born July 29, 1965) is an American politician who served in the Vermont Senate from the Essex-Orleans district from 2013 to 2021. He previously served in the Vermont House of Representatives from the Orleans-Caledonia 1 district from 2003 to 2011.

He ran as a write-in candidate in the Democratic primary for Governor of Vermont in 2018.

Rodgers also proposed a controversial bill proposing the banning of cellphone use for people under the age of 21.

References

1965 births
Living people
People from St. Johnsbury, Vermont
21st-century American politicians
Democratic Party members of the Vermont House of Representatives
Democratic Party Vermont state senators